Rasa (IAST ) refers to the creation and reception of a distinct 'flavor' or quality of something. As a Sanskrit theological concept, rasa was popularized by specific to Krishna-centered bhakti traditions, such as Gaudiya Vaishnavism from the fifteenth century. The theological use of the word can be found early, about two thousand years before the Nimbarka or Chaitanya schools of bhakti, in a phrase that Chaitanya  traditions frequently quote: "Truly, the Lord is rasa" (raso vai sah) of the Taittiriya Upanishad (2.7.1). This statement expresses the view that God is the one who enjoys the ultimate rasa, or spiritual rapture and emotions.

It is believed Rupa Goswami developed, under the direct guidance of Caitanya, the articulated and formulated theology of rasa as "the soul's particular relationship with the divinity in devotional love". Rupa's text draws largely from the foundational theory of rasa formed by Bharata Muni, the originator of Sanskrit dramaturgy, or Natya Sastra (perhaps as early as the 2nd century BCE). These relationships with the divinity in devotional love, rasa, can closely resemble the variety of loving feelings that humans experience with one another, such as beloved-lover, friend-friend, parent-child, and master-servant. Rasas are distinguished as lower and higher and according to Bhagavad Gita it appears that the three higher rasas are acknowledged and preferred by Arjuna. The higher rasas are described as loving, friendly, and fraternal types of relationships.

Raslila dance
In the tradition of Vaishnavism of Manipur, the Rasa Lila is depicted within classic Manipuri dance, and revolves around the same story of the love between Krishna and the cowherd girls and tells the divine love story of Krishna, svayam bhagavan and Radha, his divine beloved. This form of dance was started by Bhagya Chandra in 1779 and in some parts of India is still performed every year on Krishna Janmashtami (the festival to celebrate Krishna's birthday). According to different traditions, the rasa-lila is performed either by boys and girls, or by boys only. The dance is performed holding dandi (sticks) and is often accompanied with folk songs and devotional music.

Books
 Swami B.V. Tripurari, Rasa - Love Relationships in Transcendence. 
 Swami B.V. Tripurari, Jiva Goswami's Tattva-Sandarbha: Sacred India's Philosophy of Ecstasy
 Rupa Goswami, Nectar of Devotion (Bhakti-rasāmṛta-sindhu)

See also
 Bhakti yoga
 Radha Krishna
 Sringara
 Svayam bhagavan
 Turiya

Notes

References

 Haberman, D. The Bhaktirasāmṛtasindhu of Rūpa Gosvāmin, Indira Gandhi National Centre for the Arts and Motilal Banarsidass Publishers, Delhi, 2003.

External links

Vaishnavism